John Watson was born in the 1970s in  Blackpool, England. He is one of the few remaining comic book artists who specialises in painting in oils, and has done a number of notable cover runs for both Marvel and DC comics, most recently painting all the covers for the Marvel Apes series and for the second year running, the Triple-A Baseball covers. He has also illustrated a number of trading cards.

Biography
Watson studied Fine Art at the Cheltenham & Gloucester college. He notes Norman Rockwell as an influence alongside more conventional comicbook influences such as Alex Toth, Nick Cardy, Neal Adams and George Pérez.

A comicbook fan since childhood, his official website says "When I was 12, I realised that being a millionaire, having a cave under the house and fighting crime wasn't going to happen, so I began to concentrate on 'drawing comics' instead."

Bibliography

Comics

His comic work includes:

 JLA: Riddle of the Beast (with Alan Grant, Elseworlds, DC, 2002)
 World War Hulk: Gamma Files (Marvel, 2007)

Covers
 Hawkman #11,15-21,23-25 (DC, 2002–2003)
 JSA #56-58 (DC, 2003)
 JSA Strange Adventures #1-6 (DC, 2004)
 Uncanny X-Men #477,480,483,486 (Marvel)
 Son of M (Marvel, 2006)
 Civil War: Front Line (Marvel, 2006–2007)
 Inhumans: Silent War #1-6 (Marvel, 2007)
 World War Hulk: Frontline #1-6 (Marvel, 2007)
 She-Hulk #20 (Marvel, 2007)
 Marvel Illustrated: Moby Dick  (Marvel, 2008)
 Marvel Triple A Baseball Selected covers (Marvel 2007 & 2008)
 Marvel Apes (Marvel, 2008)
 Buck Rogers (Dynamite, 2009)
 Stargate- SG1 - Daniel Jackson (Interiors)(Dynamite, 2010)

References

External links 

Wallpapers John Watson wallpapers at Marvel official site
John Watson gallerys at comicartcommunity.com

English comics artists
Living people
People from Blackpool
1970s births